Burton is an unincorporated community located in the town of Waterloo, Grant County, Wisconsin, United States. The community was platted in 1876 and named for Daniel Raymond Burt, a businessman and Wisconsin Territorial legislator.

Notes

Unincorporated communities in Grant County, Wisconsin
Unincorporated communities in Wisconsin